NHL Powerplay 98 is a sports video game developed by Radical Entertainment and published by Virgin Interactive and Sega for Microsoft Windows, PlayStation, and Sega Saturn in 1997. It is the sequel to NHL Powerplay '96; there was no "'97" entry in the NHL Powerplay series. After Virgin opted not to release the game for the Sega Saturn, Sega acquired the rights and published the Saturn version under the title NHL All-Star Hockey 98 so as to make it a continuation of Sega's own NHL All-Star Hockey series.

Development
The game was showcased at E3 1997.

Reception

NHL Powerplay 98 received a variety of reviews, with critics expressing differing opinions on a number of points. For example, while IGN, GamePro, and John Ricciardi of Electronic Gaming Monthly (EGM) all praised the player animations for their fluid movements and variety of realistic moves, Kraig Kujawa and Dean Hager (also of EGM), as well as Ryan MacDonald of GameSpot, complained that the animations are too choppy. Likewise, while Dan Hsu of EGM and MacDonald both considered the graphics to be bottom tier, Kujawa, Hager, IGN, GamePro, and Glenn Rubenstein all found them exceptionally good, especially the player models.

Reviewers widely complimented the player A.I., while the most strongly emphasized criticism of the game was the slow play speed. EGM were particularly vehement about this in their review of the Saturn version, characterizing it as a fatal flaw in an otherwise well-made game; Ricciardi said that "it almost seems like the game is running in some sort of slow motion." McDonald (reviewing the PlayStation version) and GamePro (reviewing the Saturn version) instead argued that the game fails to excel in any category and, while an overall solid outing, would not compete well against upcoming hockey games such as NHL 98. However, GamePros review of the PlayStation version gave it a positive recommendation, saying it "brings a fast and fluid game to the rink with nice graphics, solid control, and authentic sounds", even though the reviews were both written by the same critic and did not note any differences between the two versions.

Rubenstein (reviewing the Saturn version) also gave the game a positive assessment, though a more reserved one: "If you like the sport, you'll enjoy this game; the 3D graphics are smooth (although there is a noticeable slowdown at times), the play control is solid, and the laundry list of features adds to the realism." IGNs recommendation was still more tentative: "The link between polygons and gameplay has yet to be made, but NHL Powerplay '98 makes a nice attempt. If you really want a hockey game for your PlayStation, this one is probably your best bet for now."

The PC version held a 71% on the review aggregation website GameRankings based on four reviews, and the PlayStation version held a 69% based on five reviews.

Notes

References

External links
 

1997 video games
Hockey video games
National Hockey League video games
PlayStation (console) games
Radical Entertainment games
Sega Saturn games
Sega video games
Video game sequels
Video games developed in Canada
Video games scored by Graig Robertson
Virgin Interactive games
Windows games